Gyanendra Pandey (born 1949) is a historian and a founding member of the Subaltern Studies project.

Early life and career
Pandey did his schooling in Sherwood College, Nainital, and completed his B.A. (Hons.) in history at St. Stephen's College, Delhi, ranking first in the first class. He completed his D.Phil. in South Asian history under the supervision of Tapan Raychaudhuri as a Rhodes Scholar at Nuffield College, Oxford. He was a research fellow at Lincoln College, Oxford, and later at Wolfson College, Oxford, from 1974-78.

He was a lecturer in history at the University of Leeds and then at the University of Hyderabad, which were followed by a fellowship at the Centre for Studies in Social Sciences in Kolkata. In 1985 he became a professor at the University of Allahabad, moving to a similar position at the University of Delhi from 1986–1998. He was a professor of anthropology and history and chair of the Department of Anthropology at Johns Hopkins University. Presently, he is a professor of history at Emory University, Atlanta, Georgia.

Academic
Pandey has written widely on the subjects of South Asian and African-American history, on colonial and post-colonial themes, and on matters relating to subaltern studies.

He recently started a course at Emory University, US, combining Dalit history with that of African Americans. He is known for his proposition that "all racism is upper caste racism." He states.
"Upper caste, because ruling and dominant groups and classes across the globe believe it is their inherited right to rule and to live in special comfort and prosperity.  Racism, because that is a way of keeping subordinated and marginalized groups – sometimes called minorities – “in their place;” and because the assumption of the right to rule, property and ‘culture’ leads to the segregation and subordination of those without privileged access to these, and to their denigration, castigation and even expulsion at times when they are seen as challenging the existing order of caste and race, Black and White."

Select publications
Books
 . Reissued in 2006, ; and in 2012, .
Articles
 
 Pandey, Gyanendra (1999). "Can a Muslim Be an Indian?" Comparative Studies in Society and History, vol. 41, no. 4, pp. 608–629.
 "Rallying Around the Cow" (published in Subaltern Studies, Volume II)

References

External links
 Works listed at WorldCat

20th-century Indian historians
Academics of the University of Leeds
Alumni of Balliol College, Oxford
Emory University faculty
Historians of South Asia
Indian political writers
Johns Hopkins University faculty
Living people
St. Stephen's College, Delhi alumni
Delhi University alumni
Writers about Hindu nationalism
1949 births
People from Ghazipur